Duan Yingying and Wang Yafan were the champions the last time the event was held in 2017, but chose not to participate together. Duan partnered Kaitlyn Christian, but they lost in the first round to Mona Barthel and Sara Sorribes Tormo.

Wang played alongside Anna Blinkova, but lost in the final to Irina-Camelia Begu and Monica Niculescu, 6–2, 1–6, [10–12].

Seeds

Draw

Draw

References

External Links
Main Draw

Doubles 
Thailand Open - Doubles
 in women's tennis